Oliver Harvey may refer to:

 Oliver Harvey, 1st Baron Harvey of Tasburgh (1893–1968), British civil servant and diplomat
 Oliver Harvey (footballer) (born 1993), Bermudian football player
 Oliver Harvey (labor organizer) (1909–?), African American janitor and labor organizer